Eucharius Hoffmann (born Heldburg; died Stralsund, 10 May 1588) was a German composer and music theorist, Hoffmann was Kantor at Stralsund from 1566 until 1580.

Works and collections
 Eucharius Hoffmann. Musicae practicae praecepta communiora. Wittenberg, 1572
 Eucharius Hoffmann. Doctrina de tonis seu modis musicis. Greifswald, 1582

Collections:
 Eucharius Hoffmann. XXIV Cantiones, quatuor, quinque 4-6v. Wittenberg, 1577

External links

References

German classical composers
Renaissance composers
1588 deaths
Year of birth unknown
German male classical composers